William Mullins may refer to:
 William Mullins (Mayflower passenger)
 William Mullins, 2nd Baron Ventry, Anglo-Irish politician and peer
 William D. Mullins, American politician and baseball player
 William W. Mullins, American physicist and materials scientist
 Willie Mullins, Irish racehorse trainer and jockey
 Bill Mullins, Australian rugby league player
 Bill Mullins (equestrian), Irish equestrian